The National Institute on Alcohol Abuse and Alcoholism (NIAAA), as part of the U.S. National Institutes of Health, supports and conducts biomedical and behavioural research on the causes, consequences, treatment, and prevention of alcoholism and alcohol-related problems. The NIAAA functions both as a funding agency that supports research by external research institutions and as a research institution itself, where alcohol research is carried out in‐house. It funds approximately 90% of all such research in the United States. The NIAAA publishes the academic journal Alcohol Research: Current Reviews.

Past Directors
Past Directors from 1972 - present

Mission
The mission of the National Institute on Alcohol Abuse and Alcoholism is to generate and disseminate fundamental knowledge about the effects of alcohol on health and well-being, and apply that knowledge to improve diagnosis, prevention, and treatment of alcohol-related problems, including alcohol use disorder, across the lifespan.
 
NIAAA provides leadership in the national effort to reduce alcohol-related problems by:
Conducting and supporting alcohol-related research in a wide range of scientific areas including genetics, neuroscience, epidemiology, prevention, and treatment.
Coordinating and collaborating with other research institutes and Federal Programs on alcohol-related issues.
Collaborating with international, national, state, and local institutions, organizations, agencies, and programs engaged in alcohol-related work.
Translating and disseminating research findings to health care providers, researchers, policymakers, and the public.

Extramural research
Extramural research is research conducted by organizations outside the NIH with NIH support through grants, contracts, or cooperative agreements. NIAAA’s extramural research includes both clinical and basic science research.

Clinical research comprises more than 30 percent of NIAAA’s extramural research and includes programs in:
Prevention (Neo-prohibitionism)
Treatment
Health Services

The laboratories and researchers housed within NIAAA seek to unravel the biological basis of alcohol use disorders and related problems and to develop new strategies to prevent and treat these disorders.

See also
Project MATCH, an initialism for: Matching Alcoholism Treatments to Client Heterogeneity

References

External links

NIAAA's Alcohol Treatment Locator
Alcohol Research: Current Reviews – The Journal of the National Institute on Alcohol Abuse and Alcoholism

Alcohol Abuse and Alcoholism
Alcohol abuse in the United States
Alcohol in the United States
Medical research institutes in Maryland